The flag of Zeeland was adopted on 14 January 1949. designed by T.A.J.W. Schorer. In the centre of the flag, the coat of arms of Zeeland is depicted. The wavy blue lines represent the waves and the constant struggle against the sea.

Flags of the Netherlands
Flag of Zeeland
Flags displaying animals
Flags introduced in 1949